Lörzweiler is an Ortsgemeinde – a municipality belonging to a Verbandsgemeinde, a kind of collective municipality – in the Mainz-Bingen district in Rhineland-Palatinate, Germany.

Geography

Location
The winegrowing centre of roughly 2,300 inhabitants distinguishes itself in particular with its
winegrowing areas of Mainzer St. Alban and Niersteiner Gutes Domtal with their vineyards Ölgild, Königstuhl and Hohberg.

In the municipal area's south stands the 175 m-high Königstuhl, upon which on 8 September 1024 Conrad II was reportedly elected. The municipality belongs to the Verbandsgemeinde of Bodenheim, whose seat is in the like-named municipality.

Politics

Municipal council
The council is made up of 17 council members, counting the part-time mayor, with seats apportioned thus:

(as at municipal election held on 13 June 2004)

Town partnerships
 Époisses, Côte-d'Or, France

Coat of arms
The municipality's arms might be described thus: Argent a limetree seedling eradicated sable leafed of five veined vert.

Culture and sightseeing

Regular events
The kermis (church consecration festival) is held by the municipality yearly on the weekend after Ascension Day.
Beginning on the first Friday in July, the Weinfest am Königstuhl is held for four days. In November, the great beer testing is traditionally held in the Hohberghalle.
Each year on the first weekend in September, the estate festival at the Haub winery takes place.

References

Further reading
In the autobiographical novel Der Lügner (“The Liar”), Ewald Gauer describes, in many small diverting episodes, how he spent his childhood in Lörzweiler in the 1960s.

External links
Municipality’s official webpage 
Winegrowers and wineries in Lörzweiler 

Municipalities in Rhineland-Palatinate
Mainz-Bingen